"Miserable" is a song by the American rock band Lit. It is the third single released in autumn 1999 from Lit's second album, A Place in the Sun.

Meaning
Lit's vocalist, A. Jay Popoff, said that "'Miserable' is basically about feeling like you need something really bad, and when you have it, it makes you feel like shit. Some people feel it's about a person, but it's not necessarily. It can be about addiction".

Music video
The song had an accompanying music video, which was filmed around February 2000 in Los Angeles and directed by Evan Bernard and produced by Keeley Gould, in which the band is portrayed performing the song on and around a huge Pamela Anderson, who wears a white bikini and platform shoes.
The video begins by panning over Anderson's body and then reveals her to be enormous, and that the band is performing on her butt as she lies on her belly. The band is later seen hiking up the incline of her hip while she playfully waves at them.

With her foot casually poised in the air, the band stands on the bottom of her platform heels. Pamela, meanwhile glances back and giggles at them. She casually yet playfully shakes her platform heel, and A. Jay and the others struggle to keep from falling off. When they manage to keep their footing, she looks away and rolls her eyes.

This is followed by them performing on her head, her knee, returning to play on her butt, and walking across her breasts. There are also several shots interspersed of different bandmembers on her raised knee as she reclines back, watching them intently. She begins swaying to the music as the band performs around her. Shortly afterwards she starts eyeing them as she holds them in her hand.

The band goes back to performing in front of her rather than on her before it cuts to her lying down and the band on her face.

While they are performing on her face Kevin Baldes is standing on her lips. She opens her mouth, causing him to fall inside and she intentionally swallows him. The other band members panic and run from her as she chases after them.

As the members of Lit scatter, Pamela Anderson singles out Allen and easily catches up to him, despite running in high heels. She scoops him up and dangles him in front of her face. Allen puts his hands out in front of him and attempts to plead for his life. However Pamela simply regards him coldly. Unmoved, she pops him into her mouth and eats him alive.

Her next target is Jeremy, who is hiding behind a speaker. She creeps up behind him and positions herself right above the guitarist. Jeremy throws his hands up as if begging her to stop. Pamela inhales and slurps him into her mouth. She then pauses for a moment, rolling something around on her tongue. She then spits out one of his signature white-flame shoes, which had been left behind after she swallowed him.

Finally, after watching his brother and friends get swallowed, A. Jay is left, who she quickly grabs. She holds him by the collar of his shirt, which is pinched between her fingers, and gives him one final smile. After that she tosses him into the air and catches the flailing A. Jay in her mouth and devours him. Having eaten all the men, she happily strolls off and the video ends.

Charts

References

External links

1999 songs
RCA Records singles
1999 singles
Lit (band) songs